Schuppan may refer to:

  (1915–2006), German parson and author
 Sebastian Schuppan (born 1986), German footballer
 Vern Schuppan (born 1943), Australian racecar driver

Schuppan may also refer to:
 Schuppan 962CR, sports car